Rita Hinden (16 January 1909 – 18 November 1971) was a South African social democratic activist.

Born near Cape Town as Rebecca Gesundheit, she was always known as "Rita".  When she was three years old, her family's ostrich farm failed, and they moved into Cape Town itself.  There, she attended the Seminary of Good Hope, while being educated in Jewish culture and faith by her father.  She attended the University of Cape Town for a year, then her family migrated to Palestine, the first South African Jews to do so.  However, there was no opportunity for her to study in Palestine, so she moved to England, where she attended the University of Liverpool for a further year, and then the London School of Economics (LSE).

In London, she met Elchon Hinden, a medical graduate, and the two married in February 1933.  Although they briefly moved back to Palestine, they soon returned to London so Elchon could undertake further study, and the couple became active in the Independent Labour Party.  Rita also continued to study, working on a doctorate at the LSE under David Horowitz.  The couple moved to Palestine again in 1935, where they became active in the Labour Zionist movement, but became disillusioned with the rising nationalism and also Elchon's difficulties in finding suitable employment.  In 1938, they finally settled in England, and gradually became agnostic, although they remained involved in a variety of Jewish organisations.

Rita joined the Labour Party and the Fabian Society.  She obtained her doctorate in 1939 and, on the advice of R. R. Kuczynski, she founded the Fabian Colonial Bureau to research and campaign on anti-colonialism. She became the bureau's first secretary, and worked closely with Arthur Creech Jones, its first chair.  They produced numerous pamphlets, and Hinden's own book, Plan for Africa.  Although she stood down as secretary in 1950, she continued to write for it, while also serving on a variety of government committees.  She became the secretary of the Socialist Union and editor of Socialist Commentary, bodies associated with the Labour Party and particularly with Hugh Gaitskell.

References

1909 births
1971 deaths
Alumni of the London School of Economics
University of Cape Town alumni
Alumni of the University of Liverpool
Labour Party (UK) people
Members of the Fabian Society
People from Cape Town
South African emigrants to Israel
South African emigrants to the United Kingdom
South African Jews
South African Zionists